The following is a list of films set wholly or partially in Shanghai.

See also
 List of films based on location
 List of films set in Hong Kong
 List of films set in Macau
 List of fiction set in Shanghai

References 

Films set in Shanghai